Manchester Ardwick was a parliamentary constituency in the city of Manchester which returned one Member of Parliament (MP) to the House of Commons of the Parliament of the United Kingdom.  Elections were held by the first past the post voting system.

The constituency was established for the 1918 general election and abolished for the 1983 general election.

Boundaries 

1918–1950: The County Borough of Manchester wards of Ardwick, New Cross, and St Mark's.

1950–1955: The County Borough of Manchester wards of Ardwick, Longsight, New Cross, and St Mark's.

1955–1974: The County Borough of Manchester wards of Ardwick, Longsight, Rusholme, St Luke's, and St Mark's.

1974–1983: The County Borough of Manchester wards of Ardwick, Levenshulme, Longsight, and Rusholme.

Members of Parliament

Election results

Election in the 1910s

Election in the 1920s

Election in the 1930s

Election in the 1940s

Elections in the 1950s

Elections in the 1960s

Elections in the 1970s

References 

 

Ardwick
Constituencies of the Parliament of the United Kingdom established in 1918
Constituencies of the Parliament of the United Kingdom disestablished in 1983